The Alfred Rewane Gardens is a public green space along the Alfred Rewane Road in Ikoyi in Lagos. The garden which was developed by the Lagos State Government in 2018 sits on a land size of 9,174 square meters from Osborne junction through Lugard Avenue to NNPC and was named after the Nigerian business man who died October 6, 1995. The park is open for the residents within and around the radius of the garden to relax, and have a view of the busy Alfred Rewane Road.

Gallery

References 

Gardens in Lagos
2018 establishments in Nigeria